Several ships of the Royal Navy have been named HMS Rupert or derivatives of the name, after Prince Rupert of the Rhine, son of Frederick V, Elector Palatine and a famous Royalist cavalry commander during the English Civil War.

 , launched in 1666 was a third-rate ship of the line which served in the navy for 103 years.
  of 1692 was a sixth-rate ship captured by the above ship of the line during the Nine Years' War.
  of 1741 was a sloop captured by the above ship of the line during the War of Jenkins' Ear.
 , launched in 1872 was a turret ram battleship prototype sold in 1907.
  of 1915 was a First World War Royal Navy  monitor.
  of 1943 was a  purchased from the United States during World War II.

Royal Navy ship names